The Georgia–South Ossetia separation line is a de facto boundary set up in aftermath of the 1991–1992 South Ossetia War and Russo-Georgian War, which  separates the self-declared Republic of South Ossetia from the territory controlled by the Government of Georgia. South Ossetia, and those states that recognise its independence, view the line as an international border separating two sovereign states, whereas the Georgian government views it as an occupation line in accordance with the Georgian "Law on Occupied Territories of Georgia". The Constitution of Georgia does not recognize South Ossetia as having any special status within Georgia, therefore the line does not correspond to any Georgian administrative area, with the territory claimed by the Republic of South Ossetia shared out amongst several Georgian Mkhares: Shida Kartli, Imereti, Racha-Lechkhumi and Kvemo Svaneti and Mtskheta-Mtianeti.

Description
The border starts in the west at the western tripoint with Russia on the Caucasus Mountains, just south of Mount Uilpata, and proceeds overland in a rough W-shaped arc, returning to the Caucasus Mountains at the eastern Russian tripoint just north of Mount Zilga-Khokh.

History

During the 19th the Caucasus region was contested between the declining Ottoman Empire, Persia and Russia, which was expanding southwards. Russia formally annexed the eastern Georgian Kingdom of Kartli and Kakheti in 1801 (including the area of modern South Ossetia), followed by the western Georgian Kingdom of Imereti in 1804, following the Russian treaty with North Ossetia and the construction of Vladikavkaz as a base in 1784. Construction of the  Georgian Military Road was begun in 1799, following the Treaty of Georgievsk. Over the course of the 1800s Russia continued to push its frontier southwards, at the expense of the Persian and Ottoman Empires. The Georgian territories were initially organised into the Georgia Governorate, then later split off as the Georgia-Imeretia Governorate from 1840 to 1846, and finally divided into the governorates of Tiflis and Kutaisi. Unlike Abkhazia, South Ossetia was never a territorial entity prior to the Soviet era, and it was subsumed into these various administrative divisions.

Following the 1917 Russian Revolution, the peoples of the southern Caucasus had seceded from Russia, declared the Transcaucasian Democratic Federative Republic (TDFR) in 1918 and started peace talks with the Ottomans. The area of modern South Ossetia was included within Georgia, though many Ossetians, who were generally poorer and typically rural tenants of Georgian landowners, were more sympathetic to the Bolshevik cause. A South Ossetian National Council (SONC) was formed and pushed for annexation by Russia or Ossetian autonomy. Rising tensions led to sporadic ethnic violence, culminating in a Georgian-Ossetian war in 1918–1920, resulting in thousands of deaths and a deepening of the ethnic divisions between Ossetians and Georgians.

Internal disagreements led to Georgia leaving the federation in May 1918, followed shortly thereafter by Armenia and Azerbaijan. Russia recognised the independence of Georgia via the Treaty of Moscow (1920). However, in 1921, with the support of many South Ossetians, the Red Army successfully invaded Georgia. It was agreed that Georgia would consist of the former Governorates of Tiflis, Kutaisi and Batumi, plus Sukhum and Zakatal okrugs. Partly as a reward for their loyalty to the Soviet cause, the Ossetians in Georgia were to be granted an autonomous oblast. As no South Ossetian polity had hitherto existed a border would have to be drawn from scratch, a difficult proposition given the mixed populations and difficult geography of the area. The Georgian and Ossetian revkoms were unable to come to an agreement on the matter, and it was thus referred to the Soviet's Kavbiuro in October 1921. The border thus drawn used existing administrative boundaries where possible (i.e. the uyezd and governorate boundaries) or geographic features such as mountain ranges, though ethnographic factors were the major determinant. Despite this several Georgian-inhabited villages and towns were included within South Ossetia, most notable Tskhinvali which was designated the South Ossetian capital despite Ossetians being a minority there, as it was the only sizable town in the region that could serve the purpose. Its inclusion required that several Georgian villages north of the town ipso facto became part of South Ossetia. On the other hand, several Ossetian areas were also left on the 'wrong' side, notably the Kobi area astride the Georgian Military Highway. The creation of the South Ossetian Autonomous Oblast was officially proclaimed on 20 April 1922 as a semi-autonomous area within the Georgian Soviet Socialist Republic. Georgia was later incorporated along with Armenia and Azerbaijan in the Transcaucasian SFSR within the USSR. The Georgian SSR was reconstituted in 1936, incorporating the South Ossetian AO. Some South Ossetians remained unhappy at their subordination to Georgia, for example in 1925 there was a failed movement to merge with North Ossetia. As elsewhere with the Soviet Union the boundary making is often depicted as a cynical exercise in 'divide and rule', however Arsene Saparov, a scholar who had studied in detail the course of events that led to South Ossetia's creation, has stated that, "the autonomy of South Ossetia was, in the long run, an unsuccessful attempt at conflict resolution by the Bolsheviks, and not the product of deliberate manipulations by Stalin – as is frequently believed. The boundaries of the autonomy were not drawn arbitrarily, but were the attempt to implement certain principles (ethnographic, political and ideological) on the ground."

In the late 1980s with the advent of perestroika and glasnost under Mikhail Gorbechev tensions rose between the Ossetians and Georgians, with the Ossetians pushing for full ASSR status. As tensions rose there violent clashes between Georgians and Ossetians in Tshkhinvali in late 1989. In December 1990 Georgian President Zviad Gamsakhurdia abolished South Ossetia's autonomous status, sparking the 1991–1992 South Ossetia War. Meanwhile, Georgia declared its independence in April 1991. After fierce fighting and some 1,000-2,000 deaths a ceasefire was signed in 1992, leaving the territory of the former South Ossetia AO divided between Ossetian and Georgian held areas.

Tensions increased following the election of Mikheil Saakashvili as Georgian President in 2004, with Saakashvili vowing to restore Georgian control over the breakaway regions of Abkhazia, Ajaria and South Ossetia. In 2008 Georgia attempted to wrest back South Ossetia, sparking a war with Russia which ended with Georgia's defeat and the expansion of Ossetian control to the full territory of the former South Ossetia AO.

Following the war Russia recognised the independence of both South Ossetia and Abkhazia. Since 2009 Russian and Ossetian troops have begun unilaterally demarcating the Georgia–South Ossetia border on the ground with fences and signs, in a process known as 'borderization'. Georgia rejects the process as illegal, and is especially concerned as it claims that the border is being extended beyond the boundaries of the former South Ossetian Autonomous Oblast and into Georgia 'proper'. The process has also been criticised as it has divided local people from their lands which fall on the 'wrong' side of the line, and the increased militarisation has impeded cross-border movement.

Border crossings

There are currently no legal border crossings, with South Ossetia only accessible from the north via Russia.

See also
 Georgian–Ossetian conflict

References

Works cited
 

Borders of Georgia (country)
Borders of South Ossetia
Internal borders of the Soviet Union